Edward Bailey (1814–1903) was a missionary artist.

Edward Bailey may also refer to:

Edward Battersby Bailey (1881–1965), English geologist
Edward Phillip Bailey, member of the Parliament of Bermuda
Edward Bailey (Tennessee politician), member of the Tennessee House of Representatives
Edward Bailey, a character in the film Red 2 played by Anthony Hopkins
Edward Bailey, victim of the mutiny on Victory

See also

Edward Baily (disambiguation)
Edward Bayley (disambiguation)
Ed Bailey (1931–2007), American baseball player
Teddy Bailey (born 1944), American football player